Natalia Zamora Lara (born July 10, 1987, in Ciudad Victoria, Tamaulipas) is a Mexican sport shooter. Zamora represented Mexico at the 2008 Summer Olympics in Beijing, where she competed in the women's 50 m rifle 3 positions. She was able to shoot 193 targets in a prone position, 190 in standing, and 186 in kneeling, for a total score of 569 points, finishing only in thirty-sixth place.

References

External links
NBC Olympics Profile

Mexican female sport shooters
Living people
Olympic shooters of Mexico
Shooters at the 2008 Summer Olympics
People from Ciudad Victoria
1987 births